Klingergrundsrevet is a Swedish island belonging to the Piteå archipelago. The island forms the middle part of the Vargödrag Nature Reserve. In addition, it is a protected area for birds, which means that between 1 May and 31 July the island may not be approached. To the northeast of this island lies the small island Klingergrundet.

References 

Islands of Sweden